The fair catch kick is a rule at the professional and high school levels of American football that allows a team that has just made a fair catch to attempt a free kick from the spot of the catch. The kick must be either a place kick or a drop kick, and if it passes over the crossbar and between the goalposts of the opposing team's goal, a field goal, worth three points, is awarded to the kicking team.

The fair catch kick is considered to be an obscure rule and it is rarely attempted. Because most fair catches are made well out of field goal range, and a team making a fair catch has possession of the ball and a first down, it is rarely to a team's advantage to attempt a fair catch kick rather than run a play from scrimmage. A team may attempt a fair catch kick if it makes a fair catch within reasonable range when the clock expires at the end of either half, as a half must be extended in order to allow a fair catch kick attempt. At the professional level, the last successful fair catch kick was made by Ray Wersching of the San Diego Chargers in 1976.

The fair catch kick has its origins in rugby football's goal from mark, which has since been abolished in both major rugby codes; a similar rule, the mark, is a major part of Australian rules football.

Rule
The fair catch kick rule states that, after a player has successfully made a fair catch or has been awarded a fair catch as the result of a penalty such as kick catch interference, their team can attempt a kick from the spot of the catch; the National Federation of State High School Associations (NFHS) rulebook also allows a kick to be made if the down following the fair catch or awarded fair catch has to be replayed. Prior to the kick, the opposing team must be lined up at least ten yards beyond the spot of the ball. The kick itself can be either a place kick or drop kick; a kicking tee cannot be used at the professional level, but use of a tee up to two inches in height is permitted at the high school level. Like other field goal attempts, the kicking team is awarded three points if the kick goes above the crossbar and between the goalposts of the opposing team's goal and did not touch a player of the kicking team after the kick. If the attempt fails, the opposing team is awarded control of the ball from the spot of the kick. The opposing team can also return the kick if it does not go out of bounds.

In the NFHS rulebook, the fair catch kick is specifically defined as a free kick. The National Football League (NFL) rulebook specifically states that the fair catch kick is not a free kick, instead considering the fair catch kick to be a distinct type of kick. Despite this, reporters at both levels describe the fair catch kick as a free kick.

The XFL (2020) rulebook defines the fair catch kick separately from the free kick. Under the XFL rules, a fair catch kick cannot itself be returned and the play ends when either team secures possession of the ball; the formation is executed under the XFL's rules for an onside kick, which are separate from those of the XFL's standard kickoff formation.

History
The fair catch kick found in American football originated in rugby football. A similar rule in rugby, the goal from mark, allowed a player who had fair caught a ball to attempt an uncontested free kick from the spot of the fair catch. Both major codes of rugby have eliminated the rule; rugby league abolished the goal from mark in 1922, and rugby union removed it in 1977. Australian rules football has retained the rule, and it is a vital part of the Australian game; a "fair catch" of a ball kicked more than 15 meters in the air is called a mark, and the player making the mark is then awarded a free kick.  The fair catch kick has been present in the NFL rulebook since the league's inception, and also remains in the NFHS rulebook. The fair catch kick is not legal in National Collegiate Athletics Association (NCAA) football; the NCAA abolished the fair catch in 1950, but re-added it a year later. When the fair catch returned to the rulebook, however, the option to attempt a kick after the fair catch was removed.

Usage
The fair catch kick rule is very rarely invoked, and is one of the rarest plays in football. The rule has been regarded as "obscure", "bizarre", and "quirky".  A unique set of circumstances is required for a fair catch kick to be a viable option. For one, the fair catch would need to be made at a point on the field where a field goal attempt has a reasonable chance of being successful; most fair catches are made well outside of field goal range. Furthermore, for a fair catch kick to be a viable option near the end of the fourth quarter, the team attempting the kick needs to be either tied or behind by three points or fewer; even if such a situation were to occur, a coach might still decline to attempt a fair catch kick.

For example, New England Patriots head coach Bill Belichick, known for his knowledge and utilization of obscure football rules, declined the opportunity to attempt a 75-yard fair catch kick at the end of regulation in Super Bowl LI; although kicker Stephen Gostkowski was able to kick the ball that far and the game was tied, Belichick felt the risk of a return touchdown by the opposing team off a failed kick outweighed the opportunity to score from the kick. Art McNally, who led the officiating department of the National Football League from 1968 to 1990, said that even in the event a fair catch is made within field goal range, most teams would attempt to score a touchdown unless there is not enough time left to score one. Accordingly, most fair catch kick attempts occur when a team has fair-caught a ball from a punt from deep in their opponent's territory but there is not enough time left in the half to go for a touchdown. After Cottonwood High School (Murray, Utah) kicker Ryan Nielson successfully completed a game-winning fair catch kick in 2022, coach Casey Miller said he thought "I've never seen a chance to do this play in my life. If it's not going to happen now, it will never happen in my lifetime."

Despite its drawbacks, there are several unique advantages to using the fair catch kick. Because the defense is required to be ten yards beyond the spot of the kick, the kicker can take a running start before kicking as opposed to the typical two steps taken on regular field goal attempts. Similarly, the kicker does not have to worry about a low snap because the ball is not snapped. Because the defense cannot come within 10 yards of the kicker before the ball is kicked, the kicker can give the ball a lower trajectory than a field goal kick from scrimmage without the threat of it being blocked. The fair catch kick would also be of a shorter distance than a normal field goal attempt from the same spot, because the fair catch kick is taken from the spot of the catch, while a typical field goal is taken seven yards back from the line of scrimmage. In the XFL, the rules allow for a fair catch kick after time expires and do not allow the opposing team to return it, making it a feasible end-of-half strategy where it otherwise would have been too dangerous in the NFL.

Known attempts in the NFL
The NFL does not keep a record of fair catch kick attempts, so the exact number of attempts is unknown. Out of the 26 recorded fair catch kick attempts in regular season and postseason games, six were successful; all five known attempts in exhibition games were unsuccessful. With one exception, all fair catch kick attempts were made within the last 30 seconds of either the 2nd or 4th quarter. The last successful attempt was made in 1976 by Ray Wersching of the San Diego Chargers (45 yards), and the longest successful attempt was made in 1964 by Paul Hornung of the Green Bay Packers (52 yards). The most recent fair catch kick attempt was by Carolina Panthers kicker Joey Slye, who missed a 60-yard fair catch kick wide right on October 13, 2019.

Regular season and post-season games

Exhibition games

Notes
Notes

Footnotes

References

Fair catch kick